Jules Hodgson, also credited as Joolz or J. Hogstorm, is an English musician, record producer and former member of KMFDM and The Spittin' Cobras (along with KMFDM bandmate Andy Selway). He is a former member of PIG and Lodestar. In 2006, Hodgson married pin-up model Go-go Amy and divorced in 2008. Hodgson now resides in Seattle, Washington and currently performs with local band Detonator. In 2007, he formed The Black Lab Studio. 

Hodgson is originally from Leeds, England.

References 

Living people
Year of birth missing (living people)
KMFDM members